The Trofeo Luigi Berlusconi (Luigi Berlusconi Trophy) is an annual association football friendly match. It was first organized by Italian club AC Milan, and usually played in August at the San Siro, Milan's home stadium. After a five-year hiatus, the 2021 game was organized, for the first time, by Monza and played at the Stadio Brianteo, Monza's home stadium.

The competition was founded by Milan owner Silvio Berlusconi in memory of his father Luigi, and it was originally intended to be contested by the Rossoneri and former European Cup winners; in the first edition — which took place on 23 August 1991 — they faced Juventus: the match was won by Juventus 2–1. Over the next three years, Milan played against Internazionale, Real Madrid and Bayern Munich respectively, winning all three times. Between 1995 and 2012 the "Berlusconi" was contested exclusively between Milan and Juventus. In the 19 times Milan and Juventus have played each other, Juventus holds a 10–9 edge.

Due to scheduling conflicts no game was played in 2013. The game returned in 2014 with the 23rd edition; it was scheduled in November, but was not played against Juventus, but an Argentinian team, San Lorenzo: Milan won the game 2–0 to earn its 13th trophy. The 24th edition was played between Milan and Internazionale in 2015, won by Inter 1–0. In 2021, the tournament was restored and, for the first time in its history, did not involve Milan. The match was played between Monza and Juventus.

List of results

Total won

'* defeated Internazionale, Real Madrid, Bayern Munich and San Lorenzo respectively

Top goalscorers

Statistics
Coaches to have won the trophy multiple times include:
Carlo Ancelotti: (7 times with two teams) 1999 and 2000 with Juventus and in 2002, 2005, 2006, 2007 and 2008 with AC Milan
Fabio Capello: (5 times with two teams) 1992, 1993, 1994 and 1997 with AC Milan and 2004 with Juventus
Marcello Lippi: (4 times with one team) 1995, 1998, 2001 and 2003 with Juventus
Filippo Inzaghi is the only player to have scored in and also have won the competition with two different teams: AC Milan and Juventus.

References

Italian football friendly trophies
A.C. Milan
Juventus F.C.
1991 establishments in Italy